Acalolepta laeviceps is a species of beetle in the family Cerambycidae. It was described by Stephan von Breuning in 1938. It is found in India.

References

Acalolepta
Beetles described in 1938